Parapercis sexfasciata, the grub fish, is a fish species in the sandperch family, Pinguipedidae. It is found in the Western Pacific: southern Japan to Taiwan to Indonesia. 

References

Masuda, H., K. Amaoka, C. Araga, T. Uyeno and T. Yoshino, 1984. The fishes of the Japanese Archipelago. Vol. 1. Tokai University Press, Tokyo, Japan. 437 p. (text). 

Pinguipedidae
Taxa named by Coenraad Jacob Temminck
Taxa named by Hermann Schlegel
Fish described in 1843